Gordon Smallacombe (10 February 1907 – 1957) was a Canadian track and field athlete who competed in jumping events. It was in fact the very first gold medal won in the history of the British Empire (later Commonwealth) Games. He remains the only Canadian man to win that title.

He won three titles at the Canadian Track and Field Championships, being high jump champion in 1929 and double champion in 1930 in the long and triple jump.

International competitions

References

1907 births
1957 deaths
Athletes from Toronto
Canadian male long jumpers
Canadian male high jumpers
Canadian male triple jumpers
Commonwealth Games gold medallists for Canada
Commonwealth Games medallists in athletics
Athletes (track and field) at the 1930 British Empire Games
20th-century Canadian people
Medallists at the 1930 British Empire Games